U.S. Highway 1 (US 1) in Florida runs  along the state's east coast from Key West to its crossing of the St. Marys River into Georgia north of Boulogne and south of Folkston. US 1 was designated through Florida when the U.S. Numbered Highway System was established in 1926. With the exception of Monroe County, the highway runs through the easternmost tier of counties in the state, connecting numerous towns and cities along its route, including nine county seats. The road is maintained by the Florida Department of Transportation (FDOT).

From its national southern terminus in Key West, US 1 carries the Overseas Highway, which is the Keys's main highway, north to the mainland, entering South Florida. From South Florida to Jacksonville, US 1 runs close to the coastline of the Atlantic Ocean and the Intracoastal Waterway, generally east of Interstate 95 (I-95) and west of State Road A1A (SR A1A), running roughly parallel with both roads. North of Jacksonville, US 1 curves inland toward the St. Mary's River as it enters Georgia.

As is the case with all Florida roads with national designations, the entirety of US 1 has a hidden FDOT designation:
 SR 5 from Whitehead Street/Fleming Street in Key West to Federal Highway (SR 5 north) in Lantana, Belvedere Road in West Palm Beach to the I-95/Kings Avenue (SR 5 north) interchange in Jacksonville, and the Main Street (SR 5 south) on/offramps south of the Main Street Bridge to US 1 Alternate (US 1 Alt.)/US 17 in Jacksonville.
 SR 805 from Federal Highway in Lantana to Belvedere Road in West Palm Beach.
 SR 9 from the I-95/Kings Avenue interchange in Jacksonville to the Main Street exit heading toward the Main Street bridge via the I-95 service road.
 SR 10 from the Atlantic Boulevard (US 90 east/SR 10 east) interchange to Beaver Street (US 90 west/SR 10 west) in Downtown Jacksonville via Main Street.
 SR 115 from US 1 Alt./US 17 in Jacksonville to the junction with I-95/SR 15 south/SR 115 north via the Martin Luther King Jr. Parkway.
 SR 15 from the I-95 interchange in Jacksonville to the Georgia state line near Boulogne.

Among other designations, US 1 is a designated Blue Star Memorial Highway along its entire route through the state. Markers are placed at various locations, including one in Rockledge and Fort Lauderdale.

Route description

The Keys

US 1 officially begins its northward journey at the Monroe County courthouse at the intersection of Whitehead and Fleming streets in Key West. It proceeds south as Whitehead Street, a two-lane street, until the intersection with Truman Avenue, which takes it east through central Key West. The road follows the northern shore of this section of Key West, then after curving southward, it meets SR A1A head-on at a T intersection before continuing east. This intersection also marks the southern terminus of the Overseas Highway, which US 1 is known by between here and mainland Florida.

After crossing to Stock Island and forming the boundary between the eponymous district and incorporated Key West, US 1 proceeds through unincorporated Monroe County on Boca Chica Key, past Naval Air Station Key West, and Rockland Key, where the Overseas Highway drops down to a two-lane road. It then crosses East Rockland Key, Big Coppitt Key (and its congruous district), Saddlebunch Keys, Sugarloaf Key, Park Key, Cudjoe Key (and its congruous district), Summerland Key, Ramrod Key, Middle Torch Key, Little Torch Key, Big Pine Key (and its congruous district), Scout Key, and Spanish Harbor Key. The highway expands to four lanes as it crosses the Bahia Honda Bridge, then reduces to two lanes as it traverses Bahia Honda Key, Ohio Key, Missouri Key, and Little Duck Key. After Little Duck Key, US 1 enters Knights Key, Boot Key, Key Vaca, and the town of Marathon via the Seven Mile Bridge, thus leaving the lower Keys.

US 1 runs through Marathon as a four-lane road. After Key Vaca, the road becomes two-lane once more and runs through Fat Deer Key, where it forms the northern boundary of the city of Key Colony Beach. It then continues wholly in Marathon through Long Point Key, Crawl Key, and Grassy Key. The road then crosses to Little Conch Key and then Conch Key, both part of the Duck Key district. US 1 then crosses to and traverses Long Key, which is mostly unincorporated except for the city of Layton, which the highway passes through. The road then reaches Craig Key, and then the village of Islamorada including Lower Matecumbe Key, Tea Table Key, Upper Matecumbe Key, and Windley Key. US 1 crosses a drawbridge onto Plantation Key, where it expands to four lanes and then leaves Islamorada as it crosses to Key Largo. Immediately the Overseas Highway enters Tavernier, where it temporarily splits into a pair of one-way roads through the community. Soon, the road enters the community of Key Largo, which also features another pair of one-way roads. At the northern end of the Key Largo district, about two-thirds of the way along the island, US 1 intersects County Road 905 (CR 905), which offers an alternative route out of the Keys via North Key Largo and the Card Sound Bridge. Signage approaching the intersection directs northbound motorists to take this alternative route if the lights on it are flashing. US 1 swings to the northwest, forms the southern boundary of North Key Largo, and becomes a two-lane divided road after the intersection. After crossing the Jewfish Creek Bridge (where it enters unincorporated Monroe County again) and traveling along Cross Key, US 1 crosses Manatee Creek, along with the Miami-Dade County boundary, and reaches the mainland.

Miami-Dade County

For the first  in Miami-Dade County, US 1 is a divided two-lane road bordering Everglades National Park on the west. It is named South Dixie Highway from the county line to Miami. Its first major intersection is with the north end of Card Sound Road south of Florida City. Similarly, to the south, signage directs southbound travelers approaching this intersection to take Card Sound Road if the lights on it are flashing rather than taking US 1 south to Key Largo.

Just north of the Card Sound Road intersection, US 1 meets the southern end of Krome Avenue (SR 997) and then enters Florida City. Here, US 1 intersects SR 9336, providing access westward to Everglades National Park; at the same intersection, Palm Drive (former SR 906) likewise provides access eastward to Biscayne National Park. From here northbound, the South Dixie Highway is paralleled by the South Miami-Dade Busway along the former Florida East Coast Railway alignment. Near-immediately northbound of the Palm Drive intersection, US 1 meets the southern end of the Homestead Extension of Florida's Turnpike and then crosses into Homestead at South 328th Street. The road then curves northeast through Homestead, parallel to Florida's Turnpike, leaving the city north of South 304th Street and continuing northeast through the communities of Leisure City, Modello, Naranja, Princeton, and Goulds.

At West 112th Avenue/Allapattah Road (SR 989), US 1 enters the incorporated town of Cutler Bay, soon passes under the Homestead Extension of Florida's Turnpike, and continues northeast in the town until at South 186th Street it forms the town's border for two blocks before leaving at South 184th Street. From here, the road continues northeast from this point, forming the western boundary of Palmetto Bay. In Perrine, it meets SR 994, and then divides into a one-way pair of streets, with northbound traffic directed east one block of the southbound traffic along a sweeping curve between South 183rd and South 168th streets. After the two directions of traffic rejoin, the road meets Coral Reef Drive (SR 992), then passes through Rockdale and Howard until it reaches South 136th Street (Howard Drive), meets the southern terminus of SR 973 a block later, and serves to divide Pinecrest to the southeast and Kendall and Dadeland to the northwest for the next few miles. The road is also known as Pinecrest Parkway through this section. Also through this section, US 1 meets the eastern terminus of SR 990, the southern terminus of the Palmetto Expressway (SR 826), and the eastern terminus of SR 94 at Kendall Drive.

North of Snapper Creek (Canal C-2), US 1 continues northeast and enters another section of unincorporated Miami-Dade County. Here, US 1 forms the Snapper Creek Expressway (SR 878)'s eastern terminus. Dadeland South station lies just south of the expressway, on US 1's northern side, and acts as the handover point between the South Miami-Dade Busway and the Metrorail line, which proceeds to parallel US 1 for most of its subsequent journey into Downtown Miami. The South Dixie Highway then crosses into South Miami at South 80th Street. At SR 959 (Red Road/West 57th Avenue), US 1 leaves South Miami and enters Coral Gables, passing the main campus of the University of Miami and headed northeast.  At West 38th Avenue (Brooker Street), it leaves Coral Gables and enters Miami, heading northeast toward the southern terminus of I-95 just south of Downtown Miami. At this point, there is a signage gap in the route even though it is federally and state defined as cosigning with I-95 and SR 970 all the way to Biscayne Boulevard, where US 1 signage resumes.

In Miami, US 1 first intersects SR 976, followed by the south end of SR 9, which ends up running concurrent with I-95 and is also I-95's state designation through most of Florida.

The road is then named Biscayne Boulevard through the rest of Miami-Dade County as it proceeds north on Biscayne Bay. As Biscayne Boulevard, US 1 becomes a one-way pair at an intersection with SR 970. Two blocks north, it reaches SR 968 (Flagler Street), the north–south baseline for most of Miami-Dade County. US 1 then passes by the western end of Bayfront Park and then intersects Port Boulevard (Northeast 6th Street), providing access to PortMiami, with Miami-Dade Arena at the northeastern end of the intersection. For the next few blocks, it passes by Museum Park, with I-395 at the northern end, which also marks the national southern terminus of US 41. US 1 continues through Midtown Miami, intersecting with the national southern terminus of US 27 one block south of I-195 next to the Julia Tuttle Causeway. North of I-195, the road continues through Miami as a residential road, intersecting SR 944, SR 934, and SR 915 before leaving Miami. Moving further inland, the boulevard replaces East Sixth Avenue at 61st Street. It enters the village of Miami Shores at North 87th Street. Crossing the Biscayne Canal, Miami Shores becomes North Miami. In North Miami, it intersects SR 922, leading to the Broad Causeway and SR 916. In North Miami Beach, it intersects SR 826 and SR 860. The road enters Aventura at Greynolds Park. It continues north-northeast through the city of Aventura, curving due north at North 187th Street and northeast at North 203rd Street. In Aventura, it intersects SR 856 at the southwest of Aventura Mall, and, after intersecting the former SR 854, it leaves Miami-Dade County.

Broward County

Entering Broward County near Hallandale Beach, US 1 first intersects SR 858. Next it meets the eastern terminus of SR 824, which provides access to Miramar and Pembroke Pines. Entering Hollywood, US 1 intersects SR 820 in a traffic circle around Anniversary Park. In Dania Beach, it meets SR 822 and SR 848. Here SR A1A also begins running concurrently with the road just south of Fort Lauderdale–Hollywood International Airport for a few miles. Near the southeastern corner of the airport, US 1 meets the eastern terminus of SR 818. It then proceeds to run around the eastern edge of the airport. On the northeastern corner, US 1 meets I-595. Now in Fort Lauderdale as Federal Highway, it intersects the eastern terminus of SR 84. Another half mile beyond, SR A1A ends its concurrency with US 1 and returns to the barrier island.  south of downtown, it meets the eastern terminus of SR 736. The road enters downtown Fort Lauderdale via the New River Tunnel, one of only a few underwater road tunnels in the state (the other on a state road being the Port Miami Tunnel). The next major intersection is with SR 842. The last two major intersections in Fort Lauderdale are with SR 816 and SR 870. US 1 then enters Pompano Beach. As it makes its way through Pompano Beach, it intersects SR 814. It then passes by Pompano Beach Airpark, the Pompano Beach Golf Club, and Pompano Citi Centre at the intersection of Copans Road. The road then proceeds to enter Deerfield Beach, where it meets Southeast 10th Street (SR 869) and SR 810. US 1 then crosses the Hillsboro Canal and exits Deerfield Beach and Broward County.

Palm Beach County

As US 1 enters Palm Beach County and Boca Raton, it forms the western boundary to Royal Palm Yacht and Country Club, meeting with the northern terminus of the southern section of SR 811. It passes through the heart of Boca Raton, becoming a divided road with three lanes each, becoming the eastern terminus of SR 808, intersecting SR 800, and becoming the eastern terminus of SR 794. US 1 then enters Delray Beach, becoming a one-way pair just north of Linton Boulevard, and meets SR 806 in central Delray Beach. US 1 becomes a divided highway again, entering Boynton Beach, SR 804 runs concurrent for two blocks, providing access to local beaches at Ocean Ridge via the Intracoastal Waterway. At the city limits of Lake Worth Beach and Lantana, just north of Lantana Road, US 1's hidden designation, SR 5, splits and runs parallel to US 1 a few blocks to the east. In central Lake Worth, US 1 intersects SR 802. Entering West Palm Beach, it first intersects SR 882, followed by US 98/SR 80.

At Belvedere Road, it meets the northern end of SR 5. In central West Palm Beach, it intersects SR 704, where US 1 becomes a one-way pair through the heart of West Palm Beach.  north of SR 704, SR A1A begins running concurrent with US 1. At Palm Beach Lakes Boulevard, the one-way pair ends for US 1, continuing north for 11 blocks, until it hits 25th Street, traveling on it for four blocks, as US 1 moves two blocks west as it moves north. US 1 leaves West Palm Beach and enters Riviera Beach via a bridge over the Port of Palm Beach. In Riviera Beach, US 1's concurrency with SR A1A ends at SR 708. In North Palm Beach, it meets the eastern terminus of SR 850 and SR 786, where SR A1A becomes concurrent with US 1 for about  before splitting off at the southern end of Juno Beach. In Jupiter, it intersects SR 706 and has another concurrency with SR A1A just south of the Jupiter Inlet. Entering Tequesta at the northern end of the inlet, US 1 then meets up with the northern terminus of the northern portion of SR 811 and leaves Palm Beach County north of County Line Road.

Treasure Coast

As US 1 makes its way into Martin County, it passes through Jonathan Dickinson State Park before crossing over the Florida East Coast Railway tracks. At the southern end of Hobe Sound, SR A1A splits off onto its own route. The two roads parallel each other until Stuart. Through the center of Hobe Sound, it intersects CR 708. It then leaves Hobe Sound and enters Port Salerno before it enters the heart Stuart, where it intersects SR 714 near SR 714's eastern terminus at the northwestern end of Witham Field. Through the center of Stuart, it meets SR 76. US 1 then crosses a bridge over the St. Lucie River. North of the bridge, it crosses over the Florida East Coast Railway tracks again and meets CR 707.  north of the river, it leaves Stuart and enters Jensen Beach, intersecting Jensen Beach Boulevard and passing by Treasure Coast Square.  north of Treasure Coast Square, US 1 leaves Martin County.

As US 1 enters St. Lucie County and Port St. Lucie, it first meets the eastern terminus of Port St. Lucie Boulevard (PSL Boulevard; SR 716). Further north, Crosstown Parkway (westbound) and Village Green Drive (eastbound) intersect with US 1 approximately halfway between Prima Vista Boulevard and PSL Boulevard; along with Prima Vista Boulevard, Crosstown Parkway provides Port St. Lucie with a much needed second, higher-capacity direct connection between US 1 and I-95. Continuing north into White City it intersects CR 712 (Midway Road). In Fort Pierce, it meets the eastern terminus of SR 70 and, a few miles to the north, SR 68. A  concurrency with SR A1A begins a few blocks north of SR 68 as the two roads enter St. Lucie Village. After SR A1A diverges back to its own route to the beach, US 1 meets the southern terminus of SR 608. As it continues north, it meets the eastern terminus of SR 615, SR 614, as well as SR 713. North of SR 713, US 1 veers east, crosses the Florida East Coast Railway tracks, and leaves St. Lucie County.

US 1 enters Indian River County just north of the SR 713 intersection, with its first major intersection in the county being CR 606 in Oslo. US 1 then runs parallel with the Florida East Coast Railroad, entering central Vero Beach, where it is locally known as Commerce Boulevard. It intersects SR 656 (16th Street/17th Street) and SR 60 (20th Street) and passes by the eastern end of Vero Beach Regional Airport. North of Vero Beach, US 1 travels through the villages of Gifford and Winter Beach. In Wabasso, US 1 intersects SR 510, where US 1 begins a concurrency with the Indian River Lagoon Scenic Highway. US 1 then intersects with SR 605 one block north of SR 510. US 1 then travels north to central Sebastian, where it intersects with CR 512 (Sebastian Boulevard), providing access to Fellsmere and I-95. It then enters Roseland, intersecting CR 505 a half mile south of US 1's crossing of the St. Sebastian River, where it leaves Indian River County and enters Brevard County and Central Florida.

Brevard County

US 1 enters Brevard County at the north end of the St. Sebastian River, continuing to hug the western shoreline of the Indian River. The first community it enters is Grant-Valkaria, with intersections with Micco Road, followed by Valkaria Road just east of Valkaria Airport. US 1 then travels north to Malabar, intersecting SR 514. It continues north to Palm Bay, through the central area of the city, with an intersection of CR 516 (Palm Bay Road). It is locally designated the Johnson-Grogan Highway from South Palm Bay city limits to the Melbourne city limits. As US 1 enters Melbourne, the road veers a few blocks west of the Indian River, heading toward an intersection of US 192 at the 1900 Building. A few blocks north, US 1 returns to the shoreline of the Indian River and then intersects SR 508, followed by SR 507, with US 1 veering away from the Indian River and crossing the Elbow Creek Bridge.

In 2016, an average of 52,460 vehicles daily transited US 1 between Sarno Road and Eau Gallie Boulevard.

Just north of the Elbow Creek Bridge, it enters the Eau Gallie portion of Melbourne and intersects SR 518. It then enters Palm Shores, another portion of Melbourne, leaving it just south of SR 404, the Pineda Causeway.

North of Rockledge, it enters Cocoa, running through Historic Cocoa Village on the west side and intersecting SR 520. North of Cocoa, it intersects SR 528, the lone expressway US 1 crosses in Brevard County. In Brentwood Heights, US 1 intersects CR 515 again, with US 1 resuming its status as the Indian River Lagoon Scenic Highway. US 1 continues north to Titusville, first intersecting with SR 405, with east SR 405 leading to NASA Causeway and the main entrance of the Kennedy Space Center in Merritt Island. Still in Titusville, it intersects SR 50. Now in central Titusville, US 1 intersects SR 405 again and SR 406, where the Indian River Lagoon Scenic Highway ends on US 1 and proceeds onto east SR 406. North of Titusville, US 1 steers away from the Indian River and travels in a parallel direction with I-95 from here to the Volusia County line. In Scottsmoor, just south of the Volusia County line, it intersects CR 5A, a  spur route of the road itself.

Volusia County

The road enters Volusia County just north of Scottsmoor, where US 1 branches away from I-95 and in a northeast direction toward the coast. At the intersection of SR 3 in Oak Hill, US 1 turns north, aligned with the coast. US 1 continues through central Oak Hill, intersecting CR 4164. US 1 then continues north to Edgewater, where it meets with SR 442, and meets with CR 4136 (Park Avenue) before leaving Edgewater. In New Smyrna Beach, it crosses under SR 44 and CR A1A, starting another concurrency with SR A1A. It continues through central New Smyrna Beach, passing by New Smyrna Beach Municipal Airport and leaving the town via a crossing of Spruce Creek and Rose Bay entering Allandale. A few blocks north of the creek, US 1 intersects SR 5A, a bypass running north to Ormond Beach. Now in Port Orange, US 1 runs through the core of the town, intersecting SR 421/SR A1A, ending another concurrency with SR A1A. SR A1A connects to the barrier island via the Port Orange Causeway.

US 1 then enters South Daytona, with intersections with Reed Canal Road and Big Tree Road. It then enters Daytona Beach, locally known as Ridgewood Avenue as it runs through the central part of the town. US 1's journey through Daytona Beach begins with an intersection with SR 400, which will become unsigned on I-4 west of I-95. Through Daytona Beach, US 1 provides access to four bridges crossing to the barrier island; the Memorial Bridge, followed by the Carlton Blank Bridge, which carries US 92, the Main Street Bridge and the Seabreeze Bridge. It crosses SR 430 before leaving Daytona Beach and entering Holly Hill. In Holly Hill, it intersects CR 4019 (LPGA Boulevard/11th Street), which is home to the LPGA headquarters.

It then enters the city of Ormond Beach, where US 1 is known and Younge Street, intersecting SR 40 and running parallel with CR 4079. As US 1 heads northwest, it then intersects SR 5A, the northern end of the bypass. It then crosses the Tomoka River before leaving Ormond Beach. A few miles northwest, it then meets I-95, passing through some hotels and fast-food restaurants as it crosses under the Interstate. US 1 leaves Volusia County west of I-95.

Flagler County
US 1 runs west of I-95 throughout its journey in Flagler County, running in a northwest direction. The first major intersection in the county is with Old Dixie Highway in Korona. From there, it enters Dupoint, intersecting CR 304, followed by Belle Terre Parkway. It then enters Bunnell, where it's known as State Street, with an intersection of SR 11/SR 100, with a brief concurrency with SR 100. The SR 100 concurrency ends with an intersection with SR 20/SR 100. North of Bunnell, US 1 intersects Old Dixie Highway (CR 13). US 1 then straddles the western end of Palm Coast, with an intersection with Palm Coast Parkway (CR 1424) near the northern end of the city, providing access to I-95. Before leaving Palm Coast, it intersects Old Kings Road and then leaves Flagler County via a crossing of the Pellicer Creek bridge.

St. Johns County
US 1 enters St. Johns County at the northern end of Pellicer Creek and quickly intersects with CR 204 just south of the I-95 interchange. At the I-95 interchange, US 1 stays east of the Interstate and heads into an undeveloped area. At SR 206, the road is slightly more developed, as US 1 heads toward St. Augustine Shores, followed by St. Augustine South at the crossing of Moultrie Creek. It then enters St. Augustine, first intersecting with SR 312, followed by SR 207, where US 1 is now known as Ponce De Leon Boulevard. Heading north, it intersects US 1 Business (US 1 Bus.), known locally as King Street, and a tourist route through old St. Augustine. Just north of the intersection, it crosses the San Sebastian River and then straddles on the eastern riverbed. At the northern end of St. Augustine, it intersects SR 16, followed by US 1 Bus. five blocks later. After leaving St. Augustine, it passes by the western end of Northeast Florida Regional Airport and cuts through wetlands to Durbin. At the northernmost intersection with CR 210 at Race Track Road, US 1 crosses the Duval County line and enters Jacksonville.

Duval County

From St. Johns County, US 1 starts its journey through Duval County and Jacksonville at Race Track Road, where it becomes the Philips Highway, a  section of US 1 south of Downtown Jacksonville named after Judge Henry Bethune Philips, the first chair of the State Road Department, predecessor of FDOT.  It heads north through the sparsely developed sections of southeast Jacksonville, intersecting the future I-795 (SR 9B) interchange, followed by Old St. Augustine Road in Bayard. It continues northwest, intersecting Greenland Road and the I-295 east beltway. North of I-295, US 1 enters a commercial area with multiple furniture stores, with an intersection with SR 115. A half mile northwest is an interchange with I-95. The Avenues is located in between these major intersections.

A few miles north, US 1 intersects Sunbeam Road (CR 116), which connects to SR 13. It then heads to SR 152, locally known as Baymeadows Road. As US 1 heads toward the heart of Jacksonville, it intersects with SR 202, locally known as JTB Boulevard, a freeway through eastern Jacksonville. US 1 then heads toward Bowden Road, providing access to southbound I-95, followed one block later by SR 109, locally known as University Boulevard. A few miles north, it intersects Emerson Street, signed as US 1 Alt. to the east and  SR 126 to the west. It then intersects St. Augustine Road and Philips Highway ends at I-95 exit 348.

North of Philips Highway, US 1 continues as Kings Avenue, running within a block of I-95. One block north of I-95, it intersects US 90 and starts a concurrency as the two highways head north. After crossing under I-95, the road intersects SR 13 twice, heading toward the Main Street Bridge, crossing the St. Johns River. North of the bridge, the road becomes a one-way pair, named Ocean Street northbound and Main Street southbound. It then intersects SR 228, starting a concurrency. Several blocks north, it ends the US 90 concurrency and begins a concurrency with US 90 Alt. It then intersects with SR 115 and the national southern terminus of US 23. It also ends the concurrencies of US 90 Alt. and SR 228. It also starts a concurrency with US 17. At that point, the one-way pair ends, and US 1 leaves downtown as Main Street. It then intersects US 1 Alt., and the road heads west on the Martin Luther King Jr. Parkway, ending the concurrency with US 17, which heads north. At this point, US 1 changes its unsigned state road from SR 5 to SR 15.

US 1 then intersects I-95 one last time on a cloverleaf interchange on exit 354A; the two highways will not meet again until Virginia. US 1 continues west, with the parkway ending with an intersection of US 23, which US 1 shares a concurrency with from here to the Georgia state line. The road continues northwest, intersecting SR 111 and crossing the Ribault River just north of that intersection. US 1 then intersects SR 115A. Just south of the I-295 west beltway, it passes west of the Little Trout River. It then has an interchange with the I-295 west beltway, followed by an intersection with Trout River Boulevard. US 1 then crosses the Trout River, a tributary of the St. Johns River, and intersects SR 104 immediately north of the river. The road then heads toward the Thomas Creek Conversation Area, leaving Duval County at the Thomas Creek Bridge.

Nassau County
North of the Thomas Creek Conservation Area, it enters Nassau County and Nassau Village-Ratliff. It next heads to Callahan, where it intersects with SR 115. At the center part of town, it intersects the northern terminus of SR A1A and SR 200, as well as starting a concurrency with US 301 that continues beyond the Georgia state line. Just north of Callahan, US 1 intersects CR 115. US 1 heads north toward Hilliard, which contains an intersection with CR 108. Heading north toward Georgia, it passes by a welcome center on the southbound side in Boulogne, followed by an intersection with CR 121/Lake Hampton Road, the last intersection before US 1 crosses the St. Marys River and the Georgia state line.

History

US 1 was designated nationwide on November 11, 1926, running from Miami, Florida, north to Fort Kent, Maine. The label was generally applied to the Atlantic Highway, except between Jacksonville, Florida, and Augusta, Georgia, where a more inland route was chosen. In Florida, US 1 was designated along the full length of SR 4. South of Jacksonville, this was both the Atlantic Highway and the eastern division of the Dixie Highway; the route from Jacksonville northwest into Georgia was a Jacksonville–Macon, Georgia, Dixie Highway connector.

With the Overseas Highway completed in 1938, US 1 was extended from Miami over the Overseas Highway (SR 4A) to Key West shortly afterward, where it still ends today.

The section of US 1 between Miami and Jacksonville has been replaced by I-95 for most through traffic.

In Florida, where signs for U.S. Highways formerly had different colors for each highway, the "shield" for US 1 was red. Florida began using the colored shields in 1956, but, during the 1980s, the Manual on Uniform Traffic Control Devices was revised to specify only a black and white color scheme for U.S. Highway shields. As such, federal funds were no longer available to maintain the colored signs. On August 27, 1993, the decision was made to no longer produce colored signs. Since then, the remaining colored signs have been replaced gradually by black-and-white signs.

Major intersections

Related routes
U.S. Route 1 Business (St. Augustine, Florida)
U.S. Route 1 Business (Florida City–Homestead, Florida)
U.S. Route 1 Alternate (Jacksonville, Florida)
U.S. Route 1 Alternate (St. Augustine, Florida)
U.S. Route 1 Alternate (Acosta Bridge)

See also

The Torch of Friendship

References

External links

 1 Florida
001
001
001
001
001
001
001
001
Roads in Vero Beach, Florida
001
001
001
001
001
Roads in Jacksonville, Florida
001
1926 establishments in Florida